Raumkrieg is a play-by-mail wargame that was published by Flying Buffalo.

Gameplay
Raumkrieg is a play-by-mail game set in a two-dimensional space arena, where five to nine players command their fleets to destroy each other.

Reception
W. G. Armintrout reviewed Raumkrieg in The Space Gamer No. 19. Armintrout commented that "Raumkrieg has the advantage of being a reasonably simple game."

References

Flying Buffalo games
Play-by-mail games